Mater is a formal Latin term for mother and may refer to:

Places
Mater, Belgium, a village near Oudenaarde

Health care

Australia
Mater Health Services, Brisbane, Australia
 Mater Health Services North Queensland, which incorporates:
 Mater Hospital Pimlico, Townsville, Queensland, 
 Mater Women's and Children's Hospital
Calvary Mater Hospital, Newcastle, New South Wales

UK and Ireland
Mater Infirmorum Hospital, Belfast, Northern Ireland
Mater Misericordiae University Hospital, Dublin, Ireland (the best-known hospital in Ireland that is referred to as the Mater) 
Mater Private Hospital, Dublin, Ireland

Other uses
 Mater (Cars), a character in the Disney animated film Cars
 Mater, an album by the Slovak composer Vladimír Godár featuring singer Iva Bittová
 Mater, a major part of an astrolabe
 M.A.T.E.R., a football (soccer) club in Rome

See also
 Juris Māters (1845–1885), Latvian writer and journalist
 Dura mater, the outermost layer of the meninges surrounding the brain and spinal cord in mammals
 Arachnoid mater, the middle layer of the meninges surrounding the brain and spinal cord in mammals
 Pia mater, the innermost layer of the meninges surrounding the brain and spinal cord in mammals